Events in the year 1982 in Turkey.

Incumbents
President – Kenan Evren 
Prime Minister – Bülent Ulusu

Ruling party 
 Ruling party – (Technocrat government)

Cabinet
44th government of Turkey

Events

January 
 9 January – The flow direction of sea traffic in Bosporus was changed from left to right.
 28 January – Turkish diplomat Kemal Arıkan assassinated by Armenian terrorists in Los Angeles.

April 
 8 April – Romanian–Turkish Economic Cooperation protocol signed.
 10 April – Bülent Ecevit arrested for an article he wrote.
 23 April The national broadcaster TRT broadcasts in color. 
 26 April – Second arrest of Ecevit, for a letter he wrote to a journalist.

May 
 4 May – Turkish diplomatic Orhan Gündüz was assassinated by Armenian terrorists in Boston.

June 
 2 June – Ecevit is acquitted of all charges relating to 10 April arrest.
 7 June – Turkish diplomatic Erkut Akbay and his wife Nadide Akbay  assassinated by Armenian terrorists in Lisbon.
 13 June – Beşiktaş wins the championship

July 
 23 July – Turkey and Greece sign an accord.

August 
 4 August – NSC lifts some of the restrictions on political expression.
 7 August – Armenian terrorists kill eight civilians in the Esenboğa International Airport attack. 
 27 August – Turkish diplomat Atilla Altıkat assassinated by Armenian terrorists in Ottawa.

September 
 9 September – Turkish diplomat Bora Süelkan assassinated by Armenian terrorists in Burgas.

October 
 15 October – Turkish novelist Yaşar Kemal wins the Prix mondial Cino Del Duca.

November 
 7 November: 91 percent approve the new constitution in a national referendum.
 16 November: Prime Minister Bülend Ulusu and Soviet prime minister Nikolai Tikhonov meet in Moscow.
 29 November: Turkey and United States plan improvements to ten airfields in Turkey.

December 
 15 December: Turkey and China sign an economic accord.

Births
16 January – Tuncay, footballer
4 March – Yasemin Mori, singer
15 March – Sencer Sarı, ceramicist
12 August – Meryem Uzerli, actress
26 August – Gamze Özçelik, model and TV artist
11 September – Elvan Abeylegesse, track athlete
2 October – Esra Gümüş, volleyball player
2 November –  Serkan Yalçın, footballer
8 December – Halil Altıntop and Hamit Altıntop, footballers

Deaths
28 January – Kemal Arıkan, consul (assassinated)
9 April – Turan Güneş (politician) (born 1922), Turkish politician
4 May – Orhan Gündüz, consul (assassinated)
22 May – Cevdet Sunay (born 1899), Turkish army general and politician 
27 August – Atilla Altıkat (born 1937), military attaché (assassinated)
4 November – Burhan Felek (born 1899), journalist

Gallery

See also
Turkey in the Eurovision Song Contest 1982
 1981–82 1.Lig

References

 
Years of the 20th century in Turkey